RFA Surf Pioneer (A365) was a Surf-class freighting tanker of the Royal Fleet Auxiliary. She and her sister RFA Surf Patrol were originally ordered by Polish owners but were commandeered by the Admiralty whilst building during the Korean War.

She was launched on 23 April 1951 as Beskidy, and was purchased by the Royal Fleet Auxiliary on 14 July 1951. She was decommissioned on 13 August 1960 and laid up at Devonport. She arrived at Burriana for scrapping on 28 February 1970.

References

Surf-class tankers
Tankers of the Royal Fleet Auxiliary
1951 ships